Joseph Russell Elliott (12 July 1918 – 10 September 1988) was an Australian rules footballer who played with Hawthorn in the Victorian Football League (VFL).

Elliott was recruited after an outstanding season at South Hawthorn United, he had kicked 174 goals in the 1936 season. His large haul included 25 kicked against Box Hill Methodists. He holds the record for the most goals in an Eastern Suburban Protestant Churches Association season.

Elliott's VFL career ended when he enlisted to serve in the Australian Army during World War II.

Notes

External links 

1918 births
1988 deaths
Australian rules footballers from Melbourne
Hawthorn Football Club players
Australian Army personnel of World War II
Australian Army soldiers
People from Burnley, Victoria
Military personnel from Melbourne